Micah Drew Johnson (born December 18, 1990) is an American former professional baseball second baseman. He played in Major League Baseball (MLB) for the Chicago White Sox, Los Angeles Dodgers, and Atlanta Braves.

Amateur baseball career
Johnson attended Park Tudor School in Indianapolis, Indiana, and Indiana University Bloomington, where he played college baseball for the Indiana Hoosiers baseball team. In 2011, he played collegiate summer baseball with the Cotuit Kettleers of the Cape Cod Baseball League.

Professional baseball career

Chicago White Sox
The Chicago White Sox selected Johnson in the ninth round of the 2012 MLB Draft. He started his career in 2012 with the rookie level Great Falls Voyagers. He finished the 2012 season hitting .273 in 271 at-bats with, 10 doubles, five triples, four home runs, 25 runs batted in (RBIs), and 19 stolen bases. Johnson was promoted to the Kannapolis Intimidators of the Class A South Atlantic League for the start of the 2013 season. There, he hit .342 in 304 at-bats with 17 doubles, 11 triples, six home runs, 42 RBIs, and 61 stolen bases. Due to his stellar play in the first half of the 2013 season, Johnson was promoted to the Winston-Salem Dash of the Class A-Advanced Carolina League and then the Birmingham Barons of the Class AA Southern League for the final week of the season. Johnson finished the 2013 season hitting a combined .312 in 536 at bats, 24 doubles, 15 triples, seven home runs, 58 RBIs, 50 walks, 98 strikeouts and 84 stolen bases.

Johnson began the 2014 season with Birmingham, and was promoted to the Charlotte Knights of the Class AAA International League in May. His season ended in August due to an injury to his left hamstring.

Johnson earned a spot on the White Sox 2015 opening day roster, batting ninth and played second base. He record his first major league hit, a single, in his second plate appearance.

Los Angeles Dodgers
On December 16, 2015, Johnson was traded to the Los Angeles Dodgers (with Frankie Montas and Trayce Thompson) as part of a three team trade that sent Todd Frazier to the White Sox and José Peraza, Brandon Dixon and Scott Schebler to the Cincinnati Reds. He was assigned to the Triple-A Oklahoma City Dodgers to begin the season.  He appeared in seven games in the majors, with one hit in six at-bats and 120 games in Oklahoma City, where he had a .261 batting average. The Dodgers designated him for assignment on January 10, 2017.

Atlanta Braves
On January 13, 2017, Johnson was traded to the Atlanta Braves in exchange for a player to be named later or cash considerations. Johnson fractured his wrist while making a diving catch in a spring training game on March 14. After surgery and rehabilitation, Johnson played eleven games for the Gwinnett Braves and was promoted to Atlanta on July 28.

Later career
On October 26, 2017, Johnson was claimed off waivers by the Cincinnati Reds He was designated for assignment a couple days later. On October 30, Johnson was claimed off waivers by the San Francisco Giants. He was designated for assignment on November 25. Johnson was claimed off waivers by the Tampa Bay Rays on November 27. On February 13, 2018, he was outrighted to the minors by the Rays and removed from the 40-man roster. He played for the Durham Bulls in 2018 and elected free agency on November 2.

Art career
Retiring from baseball after the 2018 season, Johnson shifted his focus to creating artwork, a hobby he had only started 3 years before. He opened an art studio in New Hampshire where he created physical artwork on canvas. Johnson also ventured into the new and fast-growing medium of NFTs. He sold multiple pieces in early 2020, selling one NFT in April for six Ethereum or approximately $940. His works frequently depicted black children in an inspirational or encouraging light.

In partnership with a blockchain-based art platform, Johnson unveiled a new piece called 'sä-v(ə-)rən-tē: on October 28, 2020. The inspiration stems from overhearing his then 4-year-old nephew ask his mother, "Can astronauts be Black?" Johnson's stated mission was to take two black youths who faced adversity and give them "sovereignty" or in other words empower them. The scene features two boys on one side of a door with an astronaut on the other. Every year on the boys’ birthdays, a QR code will pop up over the original artwork asking for Bitcoin donation. The door that is standing between them will open more each year, for eleven years, until they are face to face. This will happen on the boys 18th birthday. The boys becoming face-to-face with the astronaut is meant to symbolize them becoming adults and finally able to pursue their dreams while having options, due to the donations of the viewers.

'sä-v(ə-)rən-tē: was made available to purchase on October 29, 2020. After a period of bidding, it was sold for $117,278. At the time it was the second highest sale price for an NFT art piece, right behind Block 21 which sold at Christie's for $130K.

Personal life
During the 2014 season, Johnson took online classes through Indiana University to finish his degree. Along with his baseball career, he is also an artist and posts many of his works on his Instagram page. He intends to go to law school after his playing career, with the goal of becoming an MLB general manager.

References

External links

1990 births
Living people
Baseball players from Indianapolis
African-American baseball players
Major League Baseball second basemen
Chicago White Sox players
Los Angeles Dodgers players
Atlanta Braves players
Indiana Hoosiers baseball players
Great Falls Voyagers players
Kannapolis Intimidators players
Winston-Salem Dash players
Glendale Desert Dogs players
Birmingham Barons players
Charlotte Knights players
Oklahoma City Dodgers players
Gwinnett Braves players
Gulf Coast Braves players
Rome Braves players
Park Tudor School alumni
Durham Bulls players
Cotuit Kettleers players
21st-century African-American sportspeople
American digital artists